Aysen Sergeyevich Nikolayev (born 22 January 1972) is a Russian politician of Yakut ethnicity. Since 28 May 2018, he has served as the fourth Head of the Sakha Republic.

Early life
Nikolayev was born on 1972 in Leningrad, to a family of teachers. He has two brothers and a sister.

At the age of 16, he graduated from the Verkhnevilyuysk Physics and Mathematics School with a gold medal. Nikolayev entered the MSU Faculty of Physics at the Moscow State University. In 1994 he graduated, and in the same year he graduated from the Russian Presidential Academy of National Economy and Public Administration with a degree in Financial Management.

Political career

From 1994 to 1995 he headed AOZT SAPI Center. In 1995, Nikolayev became a member of the board of the open joint-stock company  Almazergienbank, a commercial bank based in Yakutsk. From 1995 to 1998, he was the deputy chairman of the board of the bank. From 1997 to 2002, he was a deputy of the second convocation of the upper chamber of the State Assembly of the Sakha Republic from the Olenyoksky District.

From 1998 to 2003, he was the chairman of the board of Almazergienbank, as well as the vice president of LLC FK SAPI. On 2002, he was appointed as a deputy of the 3rd convocation of the State Assembly of Yakutia from the Union of Right Forces party, till 2004. On 2004, he was elected as the Minister of Finance of Yakutia. Nikolayev become the head of the Presidential Administration and Government of Yakutia in 2007. On May 18, 2011, he was appointed First Deputy Chairman of the Government of Yakutia.

At the beginning of December 2011, the Yakutsk City Duma appointed the mayoral elections six months earlier - simultaneously with the presidential elections on March 4, 2012, and then on December 23, 2011, Yakutsk Mayor Yuri Zabolev resigned. In January 2012, Aysen Nikolayev was nominated by the United Russia party as a candidate for the mayoral elections in Yakutsk. In the elections held on March 4, 2012, Nikolaev received 47.73% of the votes with a turnout of 69.84%. According to the results of the vote, he was elected head of the administration of the city district of Yakutsk for 5 years.

In the spring of 2017, prior to the appointment of the next elections for the mayor of Yakutsk, the Yakut branch of the United Russia party held primaries of candidates for the election of the head of Yakutsk. Aysen Nikolayev scored 86%. In the summer of 2017, he was again nominated as a candidate for mayor of Yakutsk. In the 2017 Russian elections, he received 68.4% of the vote and was elected for a second term.

Head of the Sakha Republic
On May 28, 2018, by the Decree of the President of Russia Vladimir Putin, Nikolayev was appointed as the acting Head of the Sakha Republic. On the 2018 Russian elections, he was elected the Head of the Sakha Republic, gaining 71.40% of the votes cast in the elections. On September 27, 2018, he took office as Head of the Sakha Republic. 

From August 2, 2019 to January 27, 2020, he was the member of the Presidium of the State Council of the Russian Federation.

Since July 2022, it has been under sanctions from the British government because "It manages a regional state body of the Russian Federation, which supports or implements actions or policies that undermine or threaten the territorial integrity, sovereignty and independence of Ukraine."

Personal life
Nikolayev is married to Lyudmila Valerievna Nikolayeva. She has worked in executive positions in diamond mining companies since 2005. They have three children. 

Since 2010. Nikolayev has also served as the President of the Equestrian Federation of the Republic of Sakha. He is also the member of the Political Council of the regional branch of United Russia.

Awards 

 "Honorary Citizen of Yakutsk" (September 10, 2022)
 Order of Friendship (March 21, 2022) - for great contribution to the socio-economic development of the Republic of Sakha (Yakutia)
 Order of the Holy Prince Alexander Nevsky (January 22, 2022)

References 

Heads of the Sakha Republic
Living people
1972 births
United Russia politicians
21st-century Russian politicians
Yakut people
Politicians from Saint Petersburg
Mayors of Yakutsk
Russian Presidential Academy of National Economy and Public Administration alumni
Russian Academy of State Service alumni
Moscow State University alumni